Robert Wolders (28 September 1936 – 12 July 2018) was a Dutch television actor known for his role in the US television series Laredo and appearing in series such as The Man from U.N.C.L.E., Bewitched  and The Mary Tyler Moore Show. He was married to Merle Oberon, and was the longtime partner of Audrey Hepburn.

Career
Typecast as a "Latin Lover" because of his good looks and exotic accent, Wolders started out appearing in TV series like Flipper and The John Forsythe Show. He signed a contract with Universal Pictures that led to several film roles as well as landing the role of Erik Hunter in the second season of the TV series Laredo. He also had guest roles in other shows, including Daniel Boone, The Man from U.N.C.L.E., The Name of the Game, The F.B.I., Bewitched, and The Mary Tyler Moore Show. Wolders stopped acting shortly after marrying Merle Oberon in 1975.

Personal life

Wolders met actress Merle Oberon while filming Interval in 1973. Oberon was married at the time, but after filming with Wolders she divorced her husband of sixteen years, Bruno Pagliai, and married Wolders in 1975. Wolders was 25 years younger than Oberon. They remained married until her death in 1979.

In 1980, Wolders became the companion of Audrey Hepburn until her death in 1993. From 1994 to 1995, he and actress-dancer Leslie Caron were a couple.

In 1995, Wolders began a relationship with Henry Fonda's widow, Shirlee Fonda.

Wolders died on 12 July 2018, at the age of 81.

Filmography

References

External links

1936 births
2018 deaths
Dutch male film actors
Dutch male television actors
Actors from Rotterdam
Dutch expatriates in the United States
20th-century Dutch male actors